The 2007 Nigerian Senate election in Lagos State was held on 21 April 2007, to elect members of the Nigerian Senate to represent Lagos State. Munirudeen Adekunle Muse representing Lagos Central, Adeleke Mamora representing Lagos East and Ganiyu Solomon representing Lagos West all won on the platform of the Action Congress

Overview

Summary

Results

Lagos Central 
The election was won by Munirudeen Adekunle Muse of the Action Congress.

Lagos East 
The election was won by Adeleke Mamora of the Action Congress.

Lagos West 
The election was won by Ganiyu Solomon of the Action Congress.

References 

April 2007 events in Nigeria
Lagos
Lagos State Senate elections